John Daniel Gould (16 December 1919 – 1957) was a Scottish footballer who played for Arbroath, Celtic (wartime guest), Albion Rovers, Raith Rovers (wartime guest), Dumbarton (wartime guest), Ayr United and Stenhousemuir.

References

External links
 John Gould, The Celtic Wiki 

1919 births
1957 deaths
Scottish footballers
Footballers from Glasgow 
Dumbarton F.C. wartime guest players
Celtic F.C. wartime guest players
Arbroath F.C. players
Albion Rovers F.C. players
Ayr United F.C. players
Stenhousemuir F.C. players
Date of death missing
Raith Rovers F.C. wartime guest players
Greenock Morton F.C. wartime guest players
Scottish Football League players
Scottish Junior Football Association players
Association football outside forwards
Neilston Victoria F.C. players